Damián Alberto Martínez (born 31 January 1990) is an Argentine professional footballer who plays as a right-back for Rosario Central in the Argentine Primera División.

Career

Club
Martínez started his career with San Lorenzo in 2009, making his professional debut on 3 April in an Argentine Primera División match with Arsenal de Sarandí. That was one of nine appearances for San Lorenzo between 2009 and 2010. In 2011, Martínez was loaned out to Independiente Rivadavia of Primera B Nacional. He remained for two seasons, 2010–11 and 2011–12, and scored one goal (versus Boca Unidos) in thirty-two matches. He returned to San Lorenzo in 2012 and subsequently made two more appearances, prior to leaving permanently to sign for Primera B Nacional's Aldosivi in 2013.

He scored in his first start for Aldosivi, in a 2–2 tie with Independiente on 17 August 2013. In total, Martínez featured thirty-three times for Aldosivi throughout the 2013–14 campaign. In June 2014, Martínez joined Argentine Primera División side Defensa y Justicia. Three years later, after scoring once in fifty-five matches for the club, he left Defensa y Justicia to play for fellow top-flight team Independiente. His first appearance for Independiente came against Defensa y Justicia on 8 August 2016, in a home defeat in the Copa Argentina. On 2 August 2017, Unión Santa Fe loaned Martínez for 2017–18.

International
Martínez won twelve caps and scored one goal, versus Paraguay, for the Argentina U17 team in 2007. He was selected for the 2007 South American Under-17 Football Championship in Ecuador and the 2007 FIFA U-17 World Cup in South Korea.

Career statistics
.

References

External links

1990 births
Living people
Footballers from Buenos Aires
Argentine footballers
Association football defenders
Argentine Primera División players
Primera Nacional players
San Lorenzo de Almagro footballers
Independiente Rivadavia footballers
Aldosivi footballers
Defensa y Justicia footballers
Club Atlético Independiente footballers
Unión de Santa Fe footballers
Rosario Central footballers